Unwind may refer to:

Unwind (novel),  a 2007 science fiction novel by young adult literature author Neal Shusterman
Stack unwinding

Music 
Unwind (Oleander album) (2001)
Unwind (VanVelzen album) (2007)
Unwind, album by Inasense (2003)
"Unwind", song by Pink from Try This (2003)